Ying Da (born July 7, 1960) is a Chinese actor and director, best known in film for portraying Louie Wang in Big Shot's Funeral (2001), Ni Zhengyu in The Tokyo Trial (2006) and Jin Shenghuo in The Message (2009), and has received critical acclaim for his television work, particularly as Zhao Xinmei in Fortress Besieged (1990) and Leng Zixing in The Dream of Red Mansions (2008).  As a director, Ying Da is best known for his comedy television series, such as I Love My Family (1993), We Are A Family (2013), Idler: Sister Ma (1999), and Sister Ma and Her Neighborhoods (2000).

Ying Da first garnered recognition for his acting in 1990, when his performance in Fortress Besieged, a television series adaptation based on the novel of the same name by Qian Zhongshu, earned him a Hundred Flowers Award for Best Supporting Actor nomination at the 13th Hundred Flowers Awards. In 2002 he won the Hundred Flowers Award for Best Supporting Actor at the 25th Hundred Flowers Awards for his performance in Big Shot's Funeral. In 2012 Ying Da's performance in You and Me which garnered him a Golden Lotus Awards nomination for Best Actor.

His son Ying Rudi is a member of the China men's national ice hockey team.

Early life and education
Ying Da was born in Beijing on July 7, 1960, to Ying Ruocheng, a director, actor, playwright and vice minister of culture from 1986 to 1990, and Wu Shiliang, a translator and interpreter of Zhou Enlai. His sister Ying Xiaole is a Chinese-American painter.

In 1973 Ying Da attended Beijing No. 72 Middle School, Where he studied alongside Jiang Wen. After completing his bachelor's degree in science from Peking University in 1983, he was assigned to Beijing Normal School in Dongcheng District as a teacher. Ying Da received a master's degree in literature and art from the University of Missouri in 1987, that same year he returned to Beijing.

Career
Ying Da made his film debut in Xie Jin's The Last Aristocrats, playing Zhou Daqing.

In 1990, he was director of the People's Arts Theatre of Beijing. That same year, for his role as Zhao Xinmei in Fortress Besieged, he was nominated for the Hundred Flowers Award for Best Supporting Actor at the 13th Hundred Flowers Awards.

In 1993, Ying Da had a cameo appearance in Chen Kaige's Farewell My Concubine, a drama film starring Leslie Cheung, Zhang Fengyi and Gong Li.

In 1997, Ying Da starred with Ng Man-tat, Eric Tsang, Zhao Benshan, Song Dandan in the comedy film Family Harmony. It earned good ratings nationwide. That same year, he starred opposite Ge You, Xu Fan, He Bing, Liu Bei in Feng Xiaogang's comedy film The Dream Factory.

In 2001, he starred in the comedy film Big Shot's Funeral, alongside Rosamund Kwan, Paul Mazursky, Donald Sutherland. The film marked the second collaboration between Ying Da and Feng Xiaogang. He received a Hundred Flowers Award for Best Supporting Actor at the 25th Hundred Flowers Awards for the role.

In 2005, he appeared in Waiting Alone, a romantic comedy starring Xia Yu, Gong Beibi and Li Bingbing.

In 2006, Ying Da portrayed Ni Zhengyu in the historical film The Tokyo Trial, directed by Gao Qunshu.

In 2008, Ying Da participated in Chen Kaige's Forever Enthralled as Feng Ziguang, a friend of Leon Lai and Zhang Ziyi's characters. That same year, he made a guest appearance as Leng Zixing in The Dream of Red Mansions, adapted from Qing dynasty novelist Cao Xueqin's classical novel of the same title.

In 2009, he starred in an espionage thriller called The Message with Zhou Xun, Li Bingbing, Zhang Hanyu, Huang Xiaoming, Alec Su, and Wang Zhiwen. The film was directed by Chen Kuo-fu and Gao Qunshu and based on Mai Jia's novel. That same year, he had a minor role in Huang Jianxin and Han Sanping's historical film The Founding of a Republic.

In 2010, Ying Da co-starred with Guo Tao, Hu Jing, Ada Choi and Kingdom Yuen in the romantic film The Love Clinic. That same year, he had key supporting role in East Wind Rain, a spy drama starring Liu Yunlong, Fan Bingbing and Li Xiaoran. He co-starred with Zhu Shimao, Chen Peisi, Vivian Wu and Qiao Renliang in the comedy film  Under the Influence. Ying Da also hosted the Chinese version of Family Feud from October 2010 to January 2011.

In 2011, he had a supporting role in the horror thriller film The Devil Inside Me. The film was directed by Zhang Qi and starred Tony Leung Ka-fai, Kelly Lin, Huang Weide and Anya Wu. He had a minor role in the romantic comedy Dear Enemy, which starred Xu Jinglei, Stanley Huang, Gigi Leung, Aarif Rahman, Christy Chung, Michael Wong, and Zhao Baogang.

In 2012, he played Mr. Ming, the lead role in Hu Qiang's You and Me, costarring Tarcy Su and Jeff Chang. He was nominated for Golden Lotus Award for Best Actor at the 2nd Macau International Movie Festival.

In 2014, Ying Da played the lead role in the comedy film Hot Blood Band, alongside Chen Xiang, Leon Dai, Anthony Wong, Kathy Chow and Cai Ming.

Personal life
Ying Da has married three times. His first wife was his university alumni at Peking University, they married in 1985 and divorced in 1987.

He married for the second time in 1989 in Beijing, to actress Song Dandan, the couple had a son Ying Batu. They divorced in 1997.

On February 24, 1997, Ying Zhuang married Liang Huan, 8 years his junior, in Beijing. They have a son Ying Rudi and a daughter.

Ancestry
His great-grandfather Ying Lianzhi (1867–1926) was the founder of Takungpao and Fu Jen Catholic University. His great-grandmother Aisin Gioro Shuzhong was a member of the Qing dynasty royal family. His great-maternal grandfather Cai Rukai (1867–1923) was president of National Beiyang University. His grandfather Ying Qianli (1900–1969) was a professor at National Taiwan University and Fu Jen Catholic University. His grandmother Cai Baozhen was president of Beijing Children's Library.

Filmography

Film

TV series

As director

Film and TV Awards

References

External links
 Ying Da at hkmdb.com
 Ying Da at Chinesemov.com

1960 births
Living people
Peking University alumni
University of Missouri alumni
Chinese male film actors
Chinese male television actors
Chinese television directors
Film directors from Beijing
Male actors from Beijing
Manchu male actors